This is a list of Nevada Wolf Pack football players in the NFL draft.

Key

Selections

References

Nevada

Nevada Wolf Pack NFL draft